The Andrew B. Cooke House in Virginia Beach, Virginia, was designed in 1953 and completed in 1959 for Andrew B. & Maude Cooke. Along with the Pope-Leighey House and the Luis Marden House, it is one of three Frank Lloyd Wright designs in Virginia. A variation of Wright's solar hemicycle designs, the Cooke House features yellow-gold brick and a copper, cantilevered roof.

In 1983, the original owners sold the house to Daniel and Jane Duhl. The Duhls sold the home for US$2.2 million in 2016 to an unnamed buyer.

References

 Storrer, William Allin. The Frank Lloyd Wright Companion. University Of Chicago Press, 2006,  (S.360)

External links

Frank Lloyd Wright buildings
Houses completed in 1959
Houses in Virginia Beach, Virginia